Ebenezer Akinsanmiro is a Nigerian footballer who plays for Inter Milan under-19.

Career 
Akinsanmiro started playing professionally for Remo Stars in 2020 as an attacking midfielder. He was part of the team that qualified the club to move from the Nigeria National League to the Nigeria Professional Football League in the 2020/2021 season league.

On 31 January 2023, Inter Milan signed him on a four-year contract.

References 

Nigerian footballers
Remo Stars F.C. players